Lightsum (stylized in all caps) is a South Korean girl group formed by Cube Entertainment. The group is composed of six members: Sangah, Chowon, Nayoung, Hina, Juhyeon, and Yujeong. The group debuted on June 10, 2021, with the release of their debut single album, Vanilla. Originally an eight-piece ensemble, members Huiyeon and Jian departed the group in October 2022.

Name
The group's name, Lightsum, is a combination of the words "light" and "sum", which symbolizes "things that shine small gather together to light up the world, delivering greater positive energy through a message of hope".

History

2017–2020: Pre-debut activities
Juhyeon participated in The Unit: Idol Rebooting Project in 2017–2018 where she finished in 25th place. Chowon, Nayoung, and Yujeong participated in Produce 48 in 2018 where they finished in 13th place, 21st place, and 51st place, respectively. It was later revealed that Chowon was rigged out of the lineup of Iz*One, and that her real final ranking was 6th place. Juhyeon later participated in Dancing High in 2018, but did not pass the evaluation round.

Chowon was cast in Bully Bad Guys and The Dominator 3: Junior Bullies in 2020.

2021–present: Introduction, debut with Vanilla, Light a Wish, and Into the Light
On April 15, 2021, Cube Entertainment announced that it would be debuting a new girl group, the first since (G)I-dle in 2018. The members were revealed in pairs from April 19 to 22 (in order: Juhyeon, Sangah, Chowon, Jian, Nayoung, Huiyeon, Hina, and Yujeong). A video trailer with all eight members was revealed on April 23, 2021. On May 27, it was announced that Lightsum would release their debut single album Vanilla on June 10. The group made their broadcast debut on Mnet's M Countdown on June 10 where they performed their debut single.

On October 13, Lightsum released their second single album Light a Wish, with "Vivace" serving as the lead single.

On May 24, 2022, Lightsum released their first extended play Into the Light, with "Alive" serving as the lead single.

On October 25, 2022, Cube Entertainment announced the departure of members Huiyeon and Jian from the group and that Lightsum would be reorganized as a group of six.

Members

Current
 Sangah
 Chowon
 Nayoung
 Hina
 Juhyeon
 Yujeong

Former
 Huiyeon
 Jian

Discography

Extended plays

Single albums

Singles

Videography

Music videos

Awards and nominations

Notes

References

External links
  

2021 establishments in South Korea
K-pop music groups
Musical groups established in 2021
Musical groups from Seoul
South Korean girl groups
Cube Entertainment artists
South Korean dance music groups